The Swordsman is a 1974 British action film directed by Lindsay Shonteff and starring Linda Marlowe, Alan Lake and Edina Ronay. It was a sequel to the 1973 film Big Zapper and follows the adventures of a female private detective named Harriet Zapper. It was produced in 1974, including location shooting in the South of France around Nice. In 1976 it was picked up for release on the Odeon Circuit by Rank Film Distributors.

Cast
 Linda Marlowe as Harriet Zapper 
 Alan Lake as Reynaud Duval 
 Jason Kemp as Karel Duval 
 Tony Then as Hock 
 Edina Ronay as Guy Champion 
 Noel Johnson as Christian Duval 
 Peter Halliday as Rabelais 
 Michael O'Malley as Gendarme 
 Graham Ashley as Bar-fly 
 William Ridoutt as Inspector Cook 
 David Robb as Alex Zendor

References

Bibliography
 Denis Gifford. British Film Catalogue, Volume I. Routledge, 2016.
 Simon Sheridan. Keeping the British End Up: Four Decades of Saucy Cinema. Reynolds & Hearn Books, 2007.

External links

1974 films
Films directed by Lindsay Shonteff
1974 action films
British action films
Films set in London
Films set in France
Films shot in London
Films shot in Nice
1970s English-language films
1970s British films